William Addison Duncan (February 2, 1836 – November 14, 1884) was a Democratic member of the U.S. House of Representatives from Pennsylvania.

Biography
William A. Duncan was born in Cashtown, Pennsylvania.  He attended the public schools, and graduated from Franklin & Marshall College in Lancaster, Pennsylvania in 1857.  He studied law, was admitted to the bar in 1859 and commenced practice in Gettysburg, Pennsylvania.

Duncan was elected district attorney in 1862 and 1868.  He was elected as a Democrat to the Forty-eighth Congress and served until his death in Gettysburg.  He had been reelected to the Forty-ninth Congress.  Interment in Evergreen Cemetery.

See also
List of United States Congress members who died in office (1790–1899)

Sources

The Political Graveyard

Duncan, William A.
Duncan, William A.
Dunkin, William
Burials at Evergreen Cemetery (Adams County, Pennsylvania)
Democratic Party members of the United States House of Representatives from Pennsylvania
19th-century American politicians